The Church of St. Nicholas ( / ) is a Serbian Orthodox church in Rijeka, Croatia. The church is dedicated to Saint Nicholas. The building of the church was completed in 1790.

History 
The church was designed by local architect Ignazio Hencke in 1787 year and was built in 1790 using money of Orthodox Serbs who fled the Ottoman Empire and settled in Fiume (Rijeka) city in 1768. At the same time urban local authorities hindered the construction. The church kept numerous icons from monasteries in Bosnia and Vojvodina.

Rijeka has a notable Serb minority (6.57% in 2011, 11,24% in 1991), while the Serb-inhabited villages of Milaši and Moravice (Gorski kotar) historically gravitated towards Rijeka.

Gallery

See also 

 Eparchy of Upper Karlovac
 Rijeka
 Serbs of Croatia
 List of Serbian Orthodox churches in Croatia

References 

Serbian Orthodox church buildings in Croatia
Buildings and structures in Rijeka
Churches completed in 1790
1790 establishments in the Holy Roman Empire
Culture in Rijeka
18th-century churches in Croatia
18th-century Serbian Orthodox church buildings